Nyunzu is a town in Tanganyika Province (formerly in Katanga Province), in eastern Democratic Republic of the Congo.

References

Populated places in Tanganyika Province